The 1983 Honduran Segunda División was the 17th season of the Honduran Segunda División.  Under the management of Roberto Norales, Sula de La Lima won the tournament after finishing first in the final round (or Cuadrangular) and obtained promotion to the 1984–85 Honduran Liga Nacional.

Final round
Also known as Cuadrangular.

Standings

Known results

References

Segunda
1983